Toolsidas Junior is a 2022 Indian Hindi-language coming-of-age sports film written and directed by Mridul Mahendra, who based it on his own life and childhood. Produced jointly by Bhushan Kumar and Krishan Kumar under T-Series Films along with Sunita Gowariker and co-screenwriter Ashutosh Gowariker in his first production-only venture under Ashutosh Gowariker Productions, the film stars Sanjay Dutt, Rajiv Kapoor, Dalip Tahil and debutante Varun Buddhadev in the lead roles, marking Kapoor's final and posthumous release following his death in February 2021, while Ankur Vikal, Chinmai Chandrashuh, Tasveer Kamil and Sara Arjun play supporting roles.

Toolsidas Junior was initially scheduled to release in cinemas on 4 March 2022. Eventually, it was released on television and digital platforms. At the 68th National Film Awards, it won the National Film Award for Best Feature Film in Hindi, and Buddhadev was awarded the National Jury Award — Special Mention.

Synopsis 
 
When Toolsidas, an ace snooker player, who 'only plays for his son', loses an important tournament to arch-rival Jimmy Tandon, his son Mridul aka Midi, decides to fulfill his father's dream. Along this journey, guidance comes from the most unlikely source in former snooker national level ex-champion Mohammad Salaam, who now trains lowly players.

Cast 
 Sanjay Dutt as Mohammed Salaam a.k.a. Salaam Bhai
 Rajiv Kapoor as Toolsidas 
 Dalip Tahil as Jimmy Tandon
 Varun Buddhadev as Mridul "Midi" Toolsidas aka Toolsidas Jr.
 Chinmai Chandranshuh as Goti Toolsidas, Midi's elder brother 
 Tasveer Kamil as Mrs. Toolsidas, Midi and Goti's mother 
 Ankur Vikal as K. K. Burman, professional snooker player
 Sara Arjun as Pia, Midi's friend

Release
Due to its non-starter status at the box office, Toolsidas Junior had a direct-to-television world release, a rare instance at the time, on Sony Max, premiering on 23 May 2022. On 25 May 2022, just two days after its television premiere, the film was made available for streaming on Netflix.

Music
The film has only one song, composed by Daniel B. George, who also wrote the background score. Titled "Udd Chala", the song is sung by Sachet Tandon and Ujjwal Kashyap, with lyrics by Swanand Kirkire.

References

External links
 

2020s Hindi-language films
Indian sports drama films
Indian children's films
Cue sports films
Snooker films